Omagh West (named after Omagh town) is a barony  in County Tyrone, Northern Ireland. It is bordered by three other baronies in Northern Ireland: Strabane Lower to the north-east; Omagh East to the east; and Lurg to the south. It also borders two baronies in County Donegal in the Republic of Ireland: Tirhugh to the south-west; and Raphoe South to the north-west.

List of settlements
Below is a list of settlements in Omagh West:

Towns
Castlederg

Population centers
Aghyaran
Clare
Dooish
Drumquin
Killen
Killeter
Mourne Beg

List of civil parishes
Below is a list of civil parishes in Omagh West:
 Ardstraw (split with barony of Strabane Lower)
 Longfield East
 Longfield West
 Termonamongan
 Urney (split with barony of Strabane Lower)

References